Rommerskirchen is the southernmost municipality in the Rhein-Kreis Neuss, in North Rhine-Westphalia, Germany.

Notable places
Rommerskirchen possesses rich historical inheritances, including numerous remains of the Roman Villae Rusticae, and those from several Frankish settlements. The town centre still contains several medieval Roman and Gothic churches and a castle. There are many buildings from even earlier modern times, as well as those from the time of the Napoleonic occupation. Many of these sites are currently closed while undergoing restoration.

Infrastructure
Rommerskirchen is the location of a large 380kV-substation of the RWE. The first 380kV-line in Germany went into service on October 5, 1957.  It began between the transformer stations of Rommerskirchen and Ludwigsburg-Hoheneck.  The strategic railway embankment begins at Rommerskirchen station, and Oekoven maintains a public railway facility. Rommerskirchen generally mean Roman Catholic Church.

Famous people
 Horst Lichter (born 1962), German chef and television presenter

References

External links
 Official site 

Rhein-Kreis Neuss